Mary Stolz (born Mary Slattery, March 24, 1920 – December 15, 2006) was an American writer of fiction for children and young adults. She received the 1953 Child Study Association of America's Children's Book Award for In a Mirror, Newbery Honors in 1962 for Belling the Tiger and 1966 for The Noonday Friends, and her entire body of work was awarded the George G. Stone Recognition of Merit in 1982.

Her literary works range from picture books to young-adult novels. Although most of Stolz's works are fiction books, she made a few contributions to magazines such as Cosmopolitan, Ladies' Home Journal, and Seventeen.

Biography

Early life

Mary Slattery  was born on March 24, 1920 in Boston, Massachusetts. Raised in Manhattan, she attended the Birch Wathen School and served as assistant editor of her school magazine, Birch Leaves. She attended Columbia University from 1936 to 1938 and the Katherine Gibbs School.

Marriage and children

At age 18, she married and had one son, Bill. Chronic pain from arthritis  worsened and she was housebound by 1949. During this time she began writing to occupy her time and ultimately drafted her first novel, To Tell Your Love (1950), on yellow legal pads. She divorced in 1956. Under doctor Thomas C. Jaleski's care, her disabling symptoms resolved and in 1965, she married Dr. Jaleski.

Career

To Tell Your Love brought Ms. Stolz into the stable of children's book editor Ursula Nordstrom. Mary Stolz admired Ursula Nordstrom, describing her as "a great editor...she reads a manuscript lovingly, but firmly, and I trust her judgement absolutely." She stayed with the Harper publishing company for much of her career, through its incarnations from Harper & Brothers to the present-day HarperCollins. Ms. Stolz wrote one book for adults, Truth and Consequence.

Death and afterward

Ms. Stolz died in Longboat Key, Florida.

Works

Children's fiction
 The Leftover Elf (1952)
 Emmett's Pig (1959)
 A Dog on Barkham Street (1960)
 Belling the Tiger (1961)
 The Great Rebellion (1961)
 Frédou (1962)
 Pigeon Flight (1962)
 The Bully of Barkham Street (1963)
 Siri the Conquistador (1963), Harper & Row
 The Mystery of the Woods (1964)
 The Noonday Friends (1965)
 Maximilian's World (1966)
 A Wonderful, Terrible Time (1967)
 Say Something (1968)
 The Story of a Singular Hen and Her Peculiar Children (1969)
 The Dragons of the Queen (1969)
 Juan (1970)
 Lands End (1974)
 Ferris Wheel (1977)
 Cider Days (1978), 
 Cat Walk (1983)
 The Explorer of Barkham Street (1985), 
 Quentin Corn (1985)
 Night of Ghosts and Hermits: Nocturnal Life on the Seashore (1985)
 Ivy Larkin (1986)
 The Cuckoo Clock (1987)
 The Scarecrows and Their Child (1987)
 Storm in the Night (1988)
 Bartholomew Fair (1990)
 Stealing Home (1992)
 Coco Grimes (1994)
 A Ballad of the Civil War (1997)
 Cezanne Pinto:  A memoir (1997)
 Casebook of a Private (Cat’s) Eye (1999)

Young adult fiction
 To Tell Your Love (1950)
 The Sea Gulls Woke Me (1951)
 The Organdy Cupcakes (1951) - republished as Student Nurse
 In a Mirror (1953)
 Ready or Not (1953)
 Pray Love, Remember (1954)
 Rosemary (1955)
 The Beautiful Friend and Other Stories (1956)
 Hospital Zone (1956)
 The Day and the Way We Met (1956), 
 Because of Madeline (1957)
 Good-By My Shadow (1957)
 And Love Replied (1958)
 Second Nature (1958)
 Some Merry-Go-Round Music (1959)
 Wait for Me, Michael (1961)
 Who Wants Music on Monday? (1963)
 A Love, or a Season (1964) - first published as Two by Two
 And Love Replied (1966), 
 A Wonderful, Terrible Time (1967)
 By the Highway Home (1971), 
 Leap Before You Look (1972)
 The Edge of Next Year (1974)
 Cat in the Mirror (1975)
 Go and Catch a Flying Fish (1979), 
 What Time of Night Is It? (1981)
 Pangur Ban (1988)

Adult fiction
 Truth and Consequence (1953)

Awards
1953 Child Study Children's Book Award, In a Mirror
1962 American Library Association (ALA) Newbery Honor,  Belling the Tiger
Boys' Club Junior Book Award, The Bully of Barkham Street
1966 Newbery Honor, 'The Noonday Friends
National Book Award finalist, The Edge of Next Year
Boston Globe-Horn Book Award honor book, The Edge of Next Year
1982 George G. Stone Center Recognition Of Merit, entire body of work
1993 Kerlan Award

See also

References

External links
 Mary Stolz: The New York State Literary Tree
 Mary Stolz Papers in the De Grummond Children's Literature Collection — with biographical note
 
Interview with Mary Stolz about winning the 1993 Kerlan Award, All About Kids! TV Series #137 (1993)

1920 births
2006 deaths
20th-century American novelists
American children's writers
American women novelists
Columbia University alumni
Newbery Honor winners
Writers from Boston
20th-century American women writers
Novelists from Massachusetts
Gibbs College alumni
Birch Wathen Lenox School alumni
21st-century American women